The 1931 season of the Primera División Peruana was the 16th season of top-flight Peruvian football. It was played by 12 teams. The national champions were Alianza Lima. Federación Universitaria and Ciclista Lima were both deducted 1 point because of walkover defeats. First Division reduced to 8 teams for 1932.

Format 
 From 1931 until 1934 the results of a reserve teams league were added as bonus points.
 From 1931 until 1942 the points system was W:3, D:2, L:1, walkover:0.

Results

Standings

Liguilla de promoción 
It was played with the last four places in the First Division and the four best in the 1931 División Intermedia.

External links 
 Peru 1931 season at RSSSF
 Peruvian Football League News 

Peru1
Peruvian Primera División seasons
1931 in Peruvian football